Flammona is a genus of moths of the family Noctuidae. The genus was erected by Francis Walker in 1863.

Species
Flammona curvifascia Warren, 1913 Sumatra
Flammona quadrifasciata Walker, 1863 Peninsular Malaysia, Sumatra, Borneo
Flammona trilineata Leech, 1900 China (Jiujiang)

References

Acontiinae
Noctuidae